Mohammed Khalid Saeid (born 24 December 1990) is a professional footballer who plays as a midfielder for Superettan club Trelleborg. Born in Sweden, he represents the Eritrea national team.

Career

Saeid was spotted at age eleven by Fulham while playing in a tournament with his team BK Forward. The English club brought him over to play with their youth team but ended up not signing him. Instead scouts from West Bromwich Albion who had watched him play for Fulham offered him a youth contract.

In 2009, he returned to his old Swedish third tier club BK Forward. Saeid played three season there and had a very successful 2011 where he scored eight goals from midfield. This caused Allsvenskan clubs like AIK, Malmö FF and Mjällby AIF to show interest in signing him. In the end he chose to stay in Örebro and signed with Örebro SK at the start of 2012. Saeid joined the Columbus Crew upon the expiration of his contract in December.

On 14 March 2015, Saeid made his debut and first career start for Columbus Crew in place of center midfielder Tony Tchani who was serving a one-game suspension.  Saied played 76 minutes in the Crew's 2-0 victory over Toronto FC.

On 31 March 2017 Minnesota United FC traded Saeid, Joshua Gatt, and an international roster spot to Colorado Rapids for Marc Burch and Sam Cronin.

On 29 December 2017, it was announced that Saeid would join Danish Superliga side Lyngby BK ahead of their 2018 season.

On 3 August 2018, Saeid transferred to IK Sirius in Allsvenskan, signing a deal running until 2021.

On 11 August 2021, Saeid signed with Trelleborg until the end of 2023.

International career
Saeid joined the Eritrea national team in September 2019 for the 2022 FIFA World Cup qualifiers. He made his debut on 10 September 2019 in a game against Namibia. He started the game and played the first 81 minutes of the game as Eritrea was eliminated from the competition.

Personal life
Saeid was born in Sweden, the child of refugees from Eritrea.

References

External links

1990 births
Living people
Eritrean footballers
Eritrean expatriate footballers
Eritrea international footballers
Swedish footballers
Swedish people of Eritrean descent
Swedish sportspeople of African descent
Swedish expatriate footballers
Association football midfielders
BK Forward players
Örebro SK players
Columbus Crew players
Minnesota United FC players
Colorado Rapids players
Lyngby Boldklub players
IK Sirius Fotboll players
Trelleborgs FF players
Allsvenskan players
Danish Superliga players
Major League Soccer players
Superettan players
Expatriate footballers in England
Expatriate soccer players in the United States
Expatriate men's footballers in Denmark
Eritrean expatriates in the United States
Swedish expatriate sportspeople in England
Swedish expatriate sportspeople in the United States
Swedish expatriate sportspeople in Denmark
Sportspeople from Örebro